Pharmakon is the name of the Danish College of Pharmacy Practice.

Pharmakon may also refer to:
 Pharmakon (philosophy), a composite concept introduced by Jacques Derrida denoting remedy, poison, and scapegoat, based on his reading of Plato's Phaedrus.
 Pharmakon (novel), a 2008 novel by Dirk Wittenborn
 Pharmakon (film), a 2012 Albanian film
 Pharmakon (noise project), a solo industrial noise project by Margaret Chardiet

See also
 Pharmakos, Ancient Greek religion
 Farmakon, Finnish band
Farmakon, album by Finnish band Skepticism
 Drug